Pop music is a musical genre.

Pop music may also refer to:

 Popular music, a number of musical genres having wide appeal
 Pop Music (album), a 1996 album by Iggy Pop

See also
 "Pop Muzik", a 1979 song by M
 Pop Music/False B-Sides, a 2011 album by Baths
 Pop'n Music, a music video game series by Konami
 This Is Pop Music, a 2000 album by Espen Lind
 Record chart, a ranking of recorded music according to popularity